Wira may refer to:
 WIRA, a radio station licensed to Fort Pierce, Florida, United States
 Proton Wira, a car
 Wira (film), a 2019 Malaysian film